Pierre Birnbaum (1940, Lourdes) is a French historian and sociologist.

Bibliography 
1977: Les Sommets de l’État. Essai sur l'élite du pouvoir en France, Paris, Éditions du Seuil, .
1979: .
1982: La Logique de l’État, Fayard, 234 p. (series: "L’Espace du politique")
1983: The Sociology of the State, University of Chicago Press
1984: Dimensions du pouvoir, Presses Universitaires de France, 261 p. (series: "Sociologie d’aujourd’hui")
1988: Un mythe politique : la « République juive ». De Léon Blum à Mendès France, Fayard.
1992: Les Fous de la République. Histoire politique des Juifs d'État, de Gambetta à Vichy, Fayard, rééd. "Poche" Éditions du Seuil, 1994. 
1994: L’Affaire Dreyfus : La République en péril, coll. « Découvertes Gallimard » (nº 213), série Histoire. Paris: Gallimard.
1996: The Jews of the Republic: A Political History of State Jews in France from Gambetta to Vichy, Stanford University Press
1998: La France imaginée. Déclin des rêves unitaires ?, Fayard.
1998: .
2006: .
2008: Un récit de « meurtre rituel » au Grand Siècle : l'affaire Raphaël Lévy, Metz, 1669, Fayard.
2010: Face au pouvoir, Éditions Galilée, .
2012: Les Deux Maisons. Les Juifs, l'État et les deux Républiques, Gallimard .
2013: La République et le Cochon, Paris, le Seuil .
2015: Sur un nouveau moment antisémite, Fayard, .
2016: Léon Blum. Un portrait, Paris, le Seuil, . - Prix du Livre d'histoire contemporaine - Quartier Latin.

See also 
 History of the Jews in France
 Antisemitism in 21st-century France

References

External links 
 Débat TV sur le sport et l'identité nationale on Ce soir (ou jamais !), France 3, 18/11/09.

20th-century French historians
21st-century French historians
French historians of religion
Historians of Jews and Judaism
French sociologists
Academic staff of Sciences Po
People from Lourdes
1940 births
Living people